The 2021 Democratic Party leadership by-election was an election held on 14 March 2021 in which the members of the Democratic Party's National Assembly eleced the party Secretary, whose seat had been vacant since 4 March of the same year.

Procedure 
Under the internal rules of the Democratic Party, if an incumbent Secretary resigns, the National Assembly can either decide to dissolve itself and call a new primary election, or choose a new Secretary who will serve until the expiration of the Assembly's four years term.

Candidates

History 
The 2019 Democratic Party leadership election had seen the victory of Nicola Zingaretti, who had become Secretary after winning over 66% of the vote. On 4 March 2021, Zingaretti resigned and asked the National Assembly to choose former Prime Minister Enrico Letta as his successor. Letta, who at the time was working in Paris as a university professor, immediately returned to Italy, where he was elected Secretary by the National Assembly in a nearly unanimous vote. In his first speech as leader of the Democratic Party, he claimed there was a need to form a broad alliance of centre-left and centrist political forces. In the same speech he also expressed support for socially progressive measures, such as making it easier for children of immigrants to obtain Italian citizenship and lowering the minimum voting age to 16, as well as for institutional reforms, such as discouraging party defections and changing the electoral law.

Results

National Assembly

Sources 

2021 elections in Italy
Democratic Party (Italy)
Political party leadership elections in Italy
2021 political party leadership elections
March 2021 events in Italy